The Meghalaya Board of School of Education (MBOSE) was set up under The Meghalaya Board of School Education Act, 1973, to regulate, control and supervise matters related to School Education in the state of Meghalaya, India. It was initially set up to control the SSLC Exam until, the Pre-University degree was discontinued by the North Eastern Hill University(NEHU) in 1996. Since then, MBOSE has been responsible for conducting the Secondary School Leaving Certificate(SSLC) as well as the Higher Secondary School Leaving Certificate(HSSLC) Exam in the state. Initially, it started functioning in the Office of the Director of Public Instruction, Shillong which was later shifted to Araimile, Tura in 1974. MBOSE also has a regional office located at the state capital of Shillong. At present, there are about 1400 affiliated schools spread across the state of Meghalaya.

See also
 Secondary School Leaving Certificate (SSLC)

References

External links
 Official Website of Meghalaya Board of School education

State secondary education boards of India
Education in Meghalaya
1973 establishments in Meghalaya
Government agencies established in 1973